Rodrigo Báez (born 8 February 1989) is an Argentine rugby union footballer who plays as a loose forward for Liceo, the Argentine Super Rugby side , and the Argentina national rugby union team.

International career

Báez came through Argentina's youth structures, representing the Pumas Under 19 team in 2008 and the Under 20 side a year later at the 2009 IRB Junior World Championship. He later went on to turn out for the Argentina Jaguars and was a member of the Pampas XV team that competed in the 2012 and 2013 Vodacom Cup competitions in South Africa, as well as their tour of Australia in 2014.

He debuted for Los Pumas in May 2011 against  and capped his debut with a try in a comfortable victory for his side.

Báez is signed to play for Jaguares until 2017.

References

1989 births
Living people
Sportspeople from Mendoza, Argentina
Jaguares (Super Rugby) players
Rugby union flankers
Rugby union number eights
Pampas XV players
Argentine rugby union players
Argentina international rugby union players